Ali Ahmed Mabkhout Mohsen Al Hajeri (born 5 October 1990) is an Emirati professional association football player who plays for UAE Pro League club Al Jazira and the United Arab Emirates national team.

Coming through the youth system, Mabkhout made his debut for Al Jazira's first team in 2009.

Club career
Mabkhout made his AFC Champions League debut against Al Ittihad on 22 April 2009, after coming on as a substitute. On 19 May 2009, he scored his first Asian Champions League goal in the 49th minute against Esteghlal in a 2–2 draw.

Mabkhout formed a partnership with Ricardo Oliveira, his teammate from 2009 to 2014; this partnership was said to contribute towards the development of Mabkhout's talents in his formative years.

International career
In the quarter-final of the 2015 AFC Asian Cup, Mabkhout scored the opening goal of a 1–1 draw with Japan at Stadium Australia in Sydney; he went on to convert his penalty kick as the UAE defeated the defending champions 5–4 in a penalty shootout.

On 10 October 2019, Mabkhout scored a hat-trick against Indonesia in a 5–0 win to become UAE's all-time leading goalscorer.

Career statistics

Club

 Assist Goals

International

Honours
Al Jazira
 UAE Pro League: 2010–11, 2016–17, 2020–21
 UAE President's Cup: 2010–11, 2011–12,2015-16
 Etisalat Emirates Cup: 2009–10
 UAE Super Cup: 2021-22

United Arab Emirates U23
 GCC U-23 Championship: 2010
 Asian Games silver medal: 2010

United Arab Emirates
 Arabian Gulf Cup: 2013
 AFC Asian Cup third place: 2015

Individual
 UAE Pro League top scorer: 2016–17, 2020–21
 Arabian Gulf Cup top scorer: 2014,  2019
 AFC Asian Cup top scorer: 2015
 AFC Asian Cup Team of the Tournament: 2015, 2019

Notes

Reference

External links 
 
 
 
 

1990 births
Living people
People from Abu Dhabi
Emirati footballers
Association football forwards
Al Jazira Club players
UAE Pro League players
United Arab Emirates international footballers
Olympic footballers of the United Arab Emirates
Footballers at the 2012 Summer Olympics
2015 AFC Asian Cup players
2019 AFC Asian Cup players
FIFA Century Club
Asian Games silver medalists for the United Arab Emirates
Asian Games medalists in football
Footballers at the 2010 Asian Games
Medalists at the 2010 Asian Games